Events in the year 1961 in Germany.

Incumbents
President – Heinrich Lübke 
Chancellor –  Konrad Adenauer

Events 
25 February - Germany in the Eurovision Song Contest 1961
23 June - 4 July - 11th Berlin International Film Festival
17 September - West German federal election, 1961
14 November - The Fourth Adenauer cabinet, led by Konrad Adenauer, is sworn in.
 Date unknown - The Bark scale is devised by German acoustics scientist Eberhard Zwicker and named after Heinrich Barkhausen who proposes the first subjective measurements of loudness.

Births 
24 January — Guido Buchwald, German football player
9 January — Petra Thümer, German swimmer
5 February — Dietmar Bär, German actor
6 February — Malu Dreyer, German politician
18 February — Armin Laschet, German politician
25 February — Hermann Gröhe, German politician
20 March — Maja Maranow, German actress (died 2016)
21 March — Lothar Matthäus, German football player and manager
19 April — Bernd Stelter, German comedian
23 April — Dirk Bach, German actor (died 2012)
29 April — Prince Heinrich of Hanover, German historian and publisher
7 May — Hans-Peter Bartels, German politician
8 May — Andrea Pollack, German swimmer
14 May
 Ulrike Folkerts, German actress
 Urban Priol, German comedian
6 June — Anke Behmer, German athlete
12 June — Hannelore Kraft, German politician
29 June — Jörg Meuthen, German politician
 15 August — Dietmar Mögenburg, German high jumper
 7 September — Jochen Horst, German actor	
 10 September — Uwe Freimuth, German decathlete
 12 September — Kirsten Fehrs, German Lutheran bishop
 14 September — Martina Gedeck, German actress
 15 September
 Hendrikje Fitz, German actress (died 2016)
 Frank Emmelmann, German sprinter
 22 October — Dietmar Woidke, German politician
 17 November — Wolfram Wuttke, German footballer (died 2015)
 2 December — Gaby Köster, German comedian 
 12 December — Jan Stressenreuter, German author (died 2018)
 26 December — Jörg Schüttauf, German actor
 27 December — Guido Westerwelle, politician (died 2016)

Deaths
 2 January — Walter Hörnlein, Wehrmacht general and Knight's Cross recipient (born 1893)
 4 February — Heinz Lord, German-American surgeon (born 1917)
 26 February — Karl Albiker, German sculptor, lithographer and arts professor (born 1878)
 12 March — Hedwig Wangel, German actress (born 1875)
 24 April — Hans-Friedrich Blunck, German jurist and writer (born 1888)
 7 May — Jakob Kaiser, German politician and resistance leader (born 1888)
 30 May - Werner Richard Heymann, German film composer (born 1896)
 7 June — Karl Henry von Wiegand, German born American journalist and war correspondent (born 1874)
 22 July — Georg Rosen, German diplomat (born 1895)
 23 July — Rudolf Katz, German politician and judge (born 1895)
 5 August — Hanns Seidel, German politician (born 1901)
 23 August — Gotthard Sachsenberg, German World War I naval aviator and fighter ace (b. 1891)
 10 September — Wolfgang von Trips, German racing driver (born 1928)
 18 October - Wilhelm Boden, German politician (born 1890)
 21 October - Karl Korsch, German politician (born 1886)
 25 October — Werner Willikens, German Imperial officer and Nazi public servant (born 1893)
 26 October — Fritz Lang, German painter (born 1877)
 7 November — Augustin Rösch, German Catholic priest (born 1893)
 30 November — Ehrenfried Pfeiffer, German scientist (born 1899)
 21 December — Hinrich Wilhelm Kopf, German politician (born 1893)
 23 December — Kurt Meyer, German Generalmajor der Waffen-SS and war criminal (born 1910)
 25 December — Otto Loewi, pharmacologist and psychobiologist (born 1873)

References

 
Years of the 20th century in Germany
1960s in Germany
Germany
Germany